Back Creek is a  long 2nd order tributary to the Rocky River in Cabarrus County, North Carolina.

Variant names
According to the Geographic Names Information System, it has also been known historically as:
Black Creek
Buck Creek

Course
Back Creek rises in a pond in northeastern Charlotte, North Carolina and then flows easterly through the northern suburbs of Charlotte into Cabarrus County to join the Rocky River about 1.5 miles southeast of Pharrs Mill.

Watershed
Back Creek drains  of area, receives about 46.9 in/year of precipitation, has a wetness index of 439.32, and is about 25% forested.

References

Rivers of North Carolina
Rivers of Cabarrus County, North Carolina
Rivers of Mecklenburg County, North Carolina